Lessons in Love is the third studio album by American singer Lloyd, released by Young Goldie Music, The Inc. Records, and Universal Motown on August 4, 2008. This is the last album to be released on The Inc. Records.

Production
The album was originally to be titled Sexual Education but was later changed to Lessons in Love for a more suitable title. Lloyd describe the album as '"The title concept derives from a schoolboy fantasy of mine". Following their participation on previous album Street Love (2007), the singer re-teamed with producers Big Reese and Jasper Cameron to work on the majority of the album, with additional production resulting from collaborations with Polow Da Don, Adonis Shropshire, James Lackey, Oak Felder (of the Knightwritaz), and others.

Reception

Commercial performance
The album debuted at number seven on the Billboard 200 and number one on the Top R&B/Hip-Hop Albums charts, with moderately successful first week sales 51,000.

The first single, "How We Do It (Around My Way)" features rapper Ludacris, only peaked at number seventy-seven on the Billboard Hot R&B/Hip-Hop Songs chart. It peaked at number seventy-five on the UK Singles Chart. "Girls Around the World" was the album's second single. It features the rapper Lil Wayne. The single was sent to U.S. radio stations for airplay consideration on May 12, 2008. It peaked at sixty-four on Billboard'''s Hot 100 and thirteen on the Hot R&B/Hip-Hop Songs chart. The third and final single was "Year of the Lover". The single version featured rapper Plies. It only peaked at number one on the Billboard Bubbling Under R&B/Hip-Hop Singles. "I Can Change Your Life" was supposed to be the fourth single from the album, but was cancelled due to the lackluster chart performance of "Year of the Lover".

Critical responseLessons in Love received mixed or average reviews from critics. It holds a 60 out of 100 from Metacritic. AllMusic gave the album 3 out of 5 stars saying, "Between 'I'm Wit It', 'Girls', and a couple other standouts, Lessons in Love cannot be dismissed, but Lloyd will have to really change it up with his fourth album to evade a real holding pattern." Rolling Stone also gave the album 3 out of 5 stars saying, "Throughout Lessons in Love'', Lloyd sounds like he's actually having fun dishing out come-ons, adding an emphatic exuberance to each one."

Track listing

Charts

Weekly charts

Year-end charts

See also
 List of Billboard number-one R&B albums of 2008

Release history

References

2008 albums
Albums produced by Big Reese
Albums produced by Eric Hudson
Albums produced by Polow da Don
Lloyd (singer) albums
Albums produced by Oak Felder